The International Association of Gendarmeries and Police Forces with Military Status, (commonly known as FIEP for France-Italia-España-Portugal, the first four members) is an association of national gendarmeries or military police forces.

Members
As of November 2022, there are 19 member forces as follows:

 National Gendarmerie (Gendarmerie Nationale) - France, joined in 1994.
 Carabinieri - Italy, joined in 1994.
 Civil Guard (Guardia Civil) - Spain, joined in 1994.
 Republican National Guard (Guarda Nacional Republicana) - Portugal, joined in 1996.
 Turkish Gendarmerie (Jandarma Genel Komutanlığı) - Turkey, joined in 1998.
 Royal Moroccan Gendarmerie (Gendarmerie Royale) - Morocco, joined in 1999.
 Royal Marechaussee (Koninklijke Marechaussee) - Netherlands, joined in 1994.
 Romanian Gendarmerie (Jandarmeria Română) - Romania, joined in 2002.
 Argentine National Gendarmerie (Gendarmería Nacional Argentina) - Argentina, joined in 2005.
 Carabiniers of Chile (Carabineros de Chile), joined in 2005.
 General Directorate of Gendarmerie- Jordan, joined in 2011.
 Lekhwiya - Qatar, joined in 2013.
 Tunisian National Guard, joined in 2016.
 Brazilian National Council of the General Commanders of the Military Police and Military Fire Corps - Brazil, joined in 2016.
 Palestinian National Security Forces, joined in 2017.
 National Guard of Ukraine, joined in 2017.
 National Gendarmerie of Djibouti, joined in 2018.
 National Guard of Kuwait, joined in 2019.
 National Gendarmerie of Senegal, joined in 2019

Observers
There are no observer forces as of November 2022.

See also
 European Gendarmerie Force
 Organization of the Eurasian Law Enforcement Agencies with Military Status

Reference

External links
Official website

Gendarmerie
Law enforcement in Europe
Military police